Gösta is a male given name, a variant of Gustav. Gösta may refer to:

People
Gösta Alexandersson (1905–1988), Swedish actor 
Gösta Åsbrink (1881–1966), Swedish gymnast and modern pentathlete
Gösta Andersson (skier) (1918–1979), Swedish cross-country skier
Gösta Andersson (wrestler) (1917–1975), Swedish wrestler
Gösta Bagge (1882–1951), Swedish professor of economics and conservative politician
Gösta Bengtsson (1897–1984), Swedish sailor
Gösta Bernhard (1910–1986), Swedish actor, film director and screenwriter
Gösta Bladin (1894–1972), Swedish track and field athlete
Gösta Bohman (1911–1997), Swedish politician and the leader of the Swedish liberal conservative Moderate Party
Gösta Brodin (1908–1979), Swedish sailor
Gösta Carlsson (1906–1992), Swedish road racing cyclist
Gösta Cederlund (1888–1980), Swedish actor and film director
Gösta Danielsson (1912–1978), Swedish chess master
Gösta Ehrensvärd (1885–1973), Swedish vice admiral
Gösta Ekman d.y. (junior), (1939–2017), Swedish actor
Gösta Ekman (senior), Sr. (1890–1938), Swedish actor
Gösta Eriksson (born 1931), Swedish rower
Gösta Eriksson (rowing) (1900–1970), Swedish rower
Gösta Frändfors (1915–1973), Swedish wrestler
Gösta Grip (1904–1998), Swedish actor
Gösta Gustafson (1886–1963), Swedish actor
Gösta Hallberg (1891–1978), Swedish athlete
Gösta Hjalmar Liljequist (1914–1995), Swedish meteorologist
Gösta Holmér (1891–1983), Swedish decathlete
Gösta Hökmark (1920–1993), Swedish major general
Gösta Knutsson (1908–1973), Swedish radio producer and children's writer
Gösta Krantz (1925–2008), Swedish actor and revue artist
Gösta Larsson (1931–2006), the first recipient ever of a dental implant
Gösta Löfgren (1923–2006), Swedish footballer
Gösta Löfgren (footballer, born 1891) (1891–1932), Finnish footballer
Gösta Lilliehöök (disambiguation), several people
Gösta Lundqvist (1892–1944), Swedish sailor
Gösta Lundqvist (geologist) (1894–1967), Swedish geologist
Gösta Mittag-Leffler (1846–1927), Swedish mathematician
Gösta "Snoddas" Nordgren (1926–1981), Swedish entertainer (singer, actor)
Gösta Nystroem (1890–1966), Swedish composer
Gösta Odqvist (1913–2005), Swedish Air Force lieutenant general
Gösta Olson (1883–1966), Swedish gymnast
Gösta Persson (1904–1991), Swedish freestyle swimmer and water polo player
Gösta Pettersson (born 1940), Swedish former professional road racing cyclist
Gösta Prüzelius (1922–2000), Swedish actor
Gösta Raquette (1896–1922), Swedish modern pentathlete
Gösta Salén (1922–2002), Swedish sailor
Gösta Sandahl, Swedish figure skater
Gösta Sandberg, (1932–2006), Swedish footballer and icehockey player
Gösta Sjöberg (1896–1968), Swedish diver
Gösta Skoglund (1903–1988), Swedish politician
Gösta Stoltz (1904–1963), Swedish chess grandmaster
Gösta Sundqvist (1957–2003), famous Finnish musician and radio personality
Gösta Törner (1895–1971), Swedish gymnast
Gösta Werner (1908–2009), Swedish film director
Gösta Winbergh (1943–2002), Swedish tenor

Fictional characters
the title character of Gösta Berling's Saga, Selma Lagerlöf's 1891 first novel, and The Saga of Gosta Berling, a 1924 film adaptation

Notes 

Swedish masculine given names